Alan Santos da Silva (born 24 April 1991), known as Alan Santos, is a Brazilian footballer who plays for Guarani as a defensive midfielder or a centre back.

Career

Brazil
Born in Salvador, Bahia, Alan Santos began his career at Vitória's youth categories, but joined Santos in a four-year deal on 26 June 2009.

On 30 August Alan Santos made his first-team debut, replacing Emerson in a 2–0 home success over Fluminense. On 8 February 2011 he was loaned to Paulista, but only appeared once for the club.

Alan Santos only played his second match for Peixe on 10 March 2012, coming on as a second-half substitute in a 1–3 loss at Mogi Mirim. He appeared in four further matches in that year, being sent off in a 3–1 home win over Palmeiras on 1 December.

After Claudinei Oliveira's appointment as first-team manager in 2013, Alan Santos was regularly used during the campaign, appearing in 20 matches (seven starts, 805 minutes of action). He scored his first professional goal on 9 May 2014, netting the second of a 2–1 away win over Princesa do Solimões.

On 8 January 2015 Alan Santos rescinded his link with Santos, and moved to fellow league team Coritiba.

Mexico
In the late 2017, Liga MX club Tigres UANL bought his rights and loaned him to Veracruz for the Clausura 2018 season. After his spell in Veracruz, he was loaned out to Al-Ittihad Kalba until the end of 2018. He went back to Tigres and was again loaned out, this time to Botafogo in his home country for the 2019 season.

Career statistics

Honours
Coritiba
Campeonato Paranaense: 2017

References

External links

 Koora profile 
 

1991 births
Living people
Sportspeople from Salvador, Bahia
Brazilian footballers
Association football midfielders
Campeonato Brasileiro Série A players
Campeonato Brasileiro Série B players
Liga MX players
Santos FC players
Paulista Futebol Clube players
Coritiba Foot Ball Club players
Botafogo de Futebol e Regatas players
C.D. Veracruz footballers
Al-Ittihad Kalba SC players
Associação Chapecoense de Futebol players
Brazilian expatriate footballers
Brazilian expatriate sportspeople in Mexico
Brazilian expatriate sportspeople in the United Arab Emirates
Expatriate footballers in Mexico
Expatriate footballers in the United Arab Emirates